Astathes splendida is a species of beetle in the family Cerambycidae. It was described by Johan Christian Fabricius in 1792. It is known from Borneo, Java and Sumatra.

References

S
Beetles described in 1792